Highway 75 is a 40 km long east-west highway in northern Israel. It runs from Haifa in the west to Nazareth and Nof HaGalil in the east.

The Highway
Commonly known as the Haifa–Nazareth Highway, Highway 75 begins in its confluence with Highway 22 just east of Downtown Haifa, from where it stretches as an elevated carriageway through the industrial area of East Haifa Bay just above sea level, where it crosses Road 4. It then runs south-eastward for about ten kilometers passing below the steep northeast slopes of the Carmel Range. At Amakim Junction, the road turns east, rising to about 160 meters above sea level. as it passes through Kiryat Tiv'on. It then descends crossing the northern edge of the Jezreel Valley. It ascends to 265 m. passing just north of Migdal HaEmek, and to over 300 m. as it enters Yafia and the natural bowl of the Nazareth Range of the Lower Galilee.

In Yafia and continuing into Nazareth, the road becomes a local thoroufare with frequent controlled intersections. At Nazareth South Junction, it detours around the southern edge of the Hirbat al-Dir neighborhood reaching HaMusachim Junction with the northern terminus of Highway 60 south of the Old City. It then makes a half circle around Nazareth, turning east, then north and then west along the border of Nazareth and Nof HaGalil, reaching an altitude of 460 m. just before terminating at Nazareth North Junction with Route 754 at 430 m.

Development
By 2014, as part of the western extension of the road, a series of viaducts were constructed in order to connect it with the Carmel Tunnels and Highway 22 towards downtown Haifa.

Junctions & Interchanges (west to east)

References

See also
List of highways in Israel
Mount Carmel
Jezreel Valley
Zevulun Valley

75